The Nanshan Mountains or Nanshan are a set of mountains in Shenzhen. The largest of them are the  Dananshan (大南山) and the  Xiaonanshan (小南山). They are located at the southern tip of Nanshan District, itself named after the mountains. With the Nanshan urban core at its north, Qianhai at its west and Shekou at its southeast, it is amongst the only greenery spaces in the southern half of the district. From the top of Dananshan views can reach west to Nei Lingding Island, east to Futian Central Business District and south to Yuen Long, Hong Kong across Shenzhen Bay.

See also
Other Nanshans
Wutongshan
Qiniangshan
List of parks in Shenzhen

References

Nanshan District, Shenzhen
Mountains of Shenzhen